Maksym Khvorost (born 15 July 1982) is a Ukrainian épée fencer.

Career
He competed in the individual and team épée events at the 2004 and 2008 Summer Olympics.

Khvorost won the bronze medal in the épée team event at the 2006 World Fencing Championships after beating Hungary in the bronze medal match. He accomplished this with his team mates Dmytro Karyuchenko, Dmytro Chumak and Bohdan Nikishyn.

Record against selected opponents
Includes results from all competitions 2006–present and major competitions from pre - 2006. The list includes athletes who have reached the quarterfinals at the World Championships or Olympic Games, plus those who have earned medals in major team competitions.

  Fabrice Jeannet 0-1
  Lee Sang Yup 0-1
  Silvio Fernandez 2-0
  Alexandru Nyisztor 0-3
  Jose Luis Abajo 1-1
  Gábor Boczkó 0-1
  Alexandr Filinov 3-0
  Jérôme Jeannet 1-1
  Krisztián Kulcsár 0-2
  Joaquim Videira 2-0
  Radosław Zawrotniak 2-1
  Stefano Carozzo 3-0
  Dmytro Chumak 1-0
  Géza Imre 2-2
  Guillermo Madrigal Sardinas 1-0
  Alfredo Rota 1-0
  Matteo Tagliariol 0-1
  Igor Tikhomirov 0-1
  Bas Verwijlen 1-0
  Ulrich Robeiri 2-1

References

External links
 Profile at the European Fencing Confederation

1982 births
Living people
Ukrainian male épée fencers
Fencers at the 2004 Summer Olympics
Fencers at the 2008 Summer Olympics
Fencers at the 2016 Summer Olympics
Olympic fencers of Ukraine
Sportspeople from Kharkiv
Universiade medalists in fencing
Universiade silver medalists for Ukraine
Universiade bronze medalists for Ukraine
Medalists at the 2001 Summer Universiade
Medalists at the 2007 Summer Universiade
Medalists at the 2009 Summer Universiade
21st-century Ukrainian people